Samuel Haywood Mirams (28 August 1837–10 October 1911) was a notable New Zealand engineer and architect. He was born in Minster, Kent, England on 28 August 1837.

References

1837 births
1911 deaths
New Zealand architects
19th-century New Zealand engineers
20th-century New Zealand engineers
People from Minster-in-Thanet